North Korea participated in the 1998 Asian Games held in Bangkok, Thailand from December 6, 1998 to December 20, 1998. Athletes from North Korea succeeded in winning 7 golds, 14 silvers and 12 bronzes, making total 33 medals. North Korea finished eighth in a medal table.

References

Korea, North
1998
Asian Games